Eldorado is an unincorporated community located in the town of Eldorado, Fond du Lac County, Wisconsin, United States. Eldorado has a post office with ZIP code 54932.

History
A post office called El Dorado was first established in 1849.

References

Unincorporated communities in Fond du Lac County, Wisconsin
Unincorporated communities in Wisconsin